Adaven is a former mining settlement and Ghost town in Nye County, Nevada.

Geography 
Adaven is located in the Quinn Canyon Range, located 30 miles north from Rachel.

History 
The village was founded in the late 1890s.  The post office was named Sharp from 1901 until 1939 when it was renamed Adaven ('Nevada' backwards). In 1953 the post office was closed, and thereafter, the town was abandoned. A few buildings and ranches remained in the early 21st century.

See also
 List of geographic names derived from anagrams and ananyms

References

Ghost towns in Nye County, Nevada
Mining communities in Nevada